In 1996, V. Utkin and J. Shi proposed an improved sliding control method named integral sliding mode control (ISMC). In contrast with conventional sliding mode control, the system motion under integral sliding mode has a dimension equal to that of the state space. In ISMC, the system trajectory always starts from the sliding surface.
Accordingly, the reaching phase is eliminated, and robustness in the whole state space is promised.

Control scheme
For a system ,  bounded uncertainty.

Mathews and DeCarlo [1] suggested to select an integral sliding surface as 
 

In this case there exists a unit or discontinuous sliding mode controller compensating uncertainty .

Utkin and Shi [2] have remarked that, if  is guaranteed, the reaching phase is eliminated.

In the case, when unmatched uncertainties occur  should be selected as  
where  is a pseudo inverse matrix [3-5].

References

1.G.P. Matthews, R.A. DeCarlo, Decentralized tracking for a class of interconnected
nonlinear systems using variable structure control. Automatica 24,
187–193 (1988)

2. V.I. Utkin, J. Shi, Integral sliding mode in systems operating under uncertainty
conditions, in Proceedings of the 35th IEEE-CDC, Kobe, Japan, 1996

3. Y. Shtessel, C. Edwards, L. Fridman, A. Levant. Sliding Mode Control and Observation, Series: Control Engineering, Birkhauser: Basel, 2014, ISBN 978-0-81764-8923.
 
4.	L. Fridman, A. Poznyak, F.J. Bejarano. Robust Ouput LQ Optimal Control via Integral Sliding Modes. Birkhäuser Basel, 2014, ISBN 978-0-8176-4961-6. 

5. Rubagotti, M.; Estrada, A.; Castaños, F.; Ferrara, A., L. Fridman. Integral Sliding Mode Control for Nonlinear Systems With Matched and Unmatched Perturbations IEEE Transactions on Automatic Control, 2011, Vol. 56, 11, pp. 2699-2704

Control theory